Recurvaria dryozona is a moth of the family Gelechiidae. It is found in Sri Lanka and India (Bengal).

The wingspan is about 8 mm. The forewings are grey or grey-whitish closely irrorated with blackish. The markings are light ochreous-brown. There is a narrow slightly curved transverse fascia before the middle, a small spot in disc at three-fourths, and another at the apex. The hindwings are grey.

References

Moths described in 1916
Recurvaria
Moths of Asia